Bathygenys is an extinct genus of oreodont of the family Merycoidodontidae, endemic to North America. It lived during the Early Oligocene 33.9—33.3 mya. Fossils are widespread through the western United States.

Bathygenys was a herbivore with a heavy body, long tail, short feet, and four-toed hooves.

Resources

Oreodonts
Eocene even-toed ungulates
Oligocene even-toed ungulates
Priabonian genus first appearances
Rupelian genus extinctions
Paleogene mammals of North America
Prehistoric even-toed ungulate genera